General elections were held in Malta on 16 and 17 October 1912. Only two of the eight elected seats were contested.

Background
The elections were held under the Chamberlain Constitution, with members elected from eight single-member constituencies.

Results
A total of 8,812 people were registered to vote.

References

1912
Malta
1912 in Malta
October 1912 events
Malta